The Aleksanteri Institute Finnish Centre for Russian and Eastern European Studies is an independent institute of the University of Helsinki. It functions as a national centre of research, study and expertise pertaining to Russia and Eastern Europe, particularly in the social sciences and humanities. The Institute actively promotes cooperation and interaction between the academic world, public administration, business life and civil society, both in Finland and abroad.

The Aleksanteri Institute was founded in 1996 and currently employs more than 50 scholars and administrative staff. The director of the institute is Professor Markku Kangaspuro.

Centre of Excellence in Russian Studies
The Aleksanteri Institute coordinated the Finnish Centre of Excellence in Russian Studies – Choices of Russian Modernisation for the period 2012–2017. The multi-disciplinary CoE was led by Markku Kivinen and it was funded by the Academy of Finland.

Research
Research at the Aleksanteri Institute concentrates on six focus areas:
 Economic Diversification
 The Welfare Society
 Democracy
 Foreign Policy
 The Social Constitution of Culture
 The Cold War and its Consequences

The institute coordinates and participates in research projects and networks involving scholars from all over the world. In 2012 it was granted a five-year funding for a Finland Distinguished Professor (FiDiPro) project. Since 2008 it has also hosted a programme for visiting scholars. The programme offers international scholars (holding a PhD) a one-to-three-month research stay at the Aleksanteri Institute and the University of Helsinki. In addition to Russia, Eastern Europe and Scandinavia, scholars from Spain, Italy, the US, Britain, Canada, France and China have also attended.

The Aleksanteri Conference
The Aleksanteri Conference is an annual conference of Russian and Eastern European studies organised in late October in Helsinki. The theme of the conference changes every year. Themes have included:
Perestroika (2007)
Gender and Welfare (2008)
The Cold War (2009)
Energy (2010)
Russia and China (2011)
Competition (2012)

Study programmes
The Aleksanteri Institute coordinates multi-disciplinary study programmes at various academic levels. The doctoral programme and the Master's School in Russian and Eastern European studies are open to students from Finnish universities. There is also a study programme for East Central Europe, Balkan and Baltic studies that offers the possibility of a MA diploma and a minor subject programme of Ukrainian studies.

Kikimora Publishing
The Aleksanteri Institute hosts Kikimora Publishing, a publishing house that concentrates on contemporary Russian and East European studies mostly in the humanities and social sciences. Kikimora has publishes monographs and anthologies in three refereed series: Kikimora A, Kikimora B and Aleksanteri Series. There is also an online series entitled Aleksanteri Papers.

The Aleksanteri Institute also publishes a quarterly newsletter, Aleksanteri News.

References

External links

University of Helsinki
Educational institutions established in 1996
1996 establishments in Finland